Niall McCusker (born 8 December 1980) is a Gaelic footballer who plays for the Derry county team, with whom he has won two National League titles. He is the current Derry vice-captain.

McCusker plays his club football for Ballinderry Shamrocks. He was instrumental in helping Ballinderry win the 2002 All-Ireland Senior Club Football Championship. He has also won four Derry Championships and an Ulster Senior Club Football Championship with the club.

He is seen as a tough, old-fashioned full-back, but is versatile and can play in almost any position. Adrian McGuckin said of McCusker "He has a great footballing brain, his positional sense is unreal and he never wastes a ball". Fellow Derry full back and captain Kevin McCloy says "I'd rather run into a train than run into Niall McCusker".

Playing career

Inter-county
McCusker made his Derry Senior debut in 1998. In 2000 he won the National League with Derry, defeating Meath in the final. McCusker was named Derry vice-captain for 2005. He sat out the 2006 and 2007 campaign, but was recalled for the 2008 campaign. He was part of the Derry team that won the 2008 National League where Derry beat Kerry in the final. He was instrumental in the final where he marked Kieran Donaghy and kept him scoreless, and in fact outscored him when he scored a great 50-metre point.

McCusker has been appointed Derry vice-captain for the 2009 season.

Club

McCusker has been on the Ballinderry senior team since he was 17. In 1998 McCusker was part of the Ballinderry team that won the All-Ireland Kilmacud Crokes Sevens Championship. After losing two finals in a row to Bellaghy in 1999 and 2000, Ballinderry won the 2001 Derry Senior Championship defeating Bellaghy in the decider. The club went on to win the 2001 Ulster Club Championship with victories over St. Gall's, Cavan Gaels and Mayobridge. Ballinderry went on to represent Ulster in the All-Ireland Senior Club Football Championship, which they won defeating Tír Chonaill Gaels (London) in the quarter-final, Rathnew (Wicklow) in the semi-final and Nemo Rangers (Cork) in the final. McCusker played a great game in that final, marking Nemo's main scoring threat Colin Corkery.

Ballinderry defended the Derry Championship in 2002, but lost in the semi-final stage of the Ulster Club Championship to Errigal Ciarán. McCusker was once again runner-up in the Derry Championship in 2003, losing to An Lúb in the final. He gained his third Derry Championship medal with the club in 2006. Ballinderry once again reached the Ulster Club final, but lost narrowly to Crossmaglen Rangers. For the 2007 season McCusker was captain of Ballinderry. In 2008 McCusker and Ballinderry won the Ulster Senior Club Football League and the Derry Championship again, and again were runners-up in the Ulster Senior Club Championship.

Honours

Inter-county
National Football League:
Winner (2): 2000, 2008
Dr McKenna Cup:
Runner up: 2005, 2008, more?

Club
All-Ireland Senior Club Football Championship:
Winner (1): 2002
All-Ireland Kilmacud Crokes Sevens Championship:
Winner (1): 1998
Runner up:? 1999?
Ulster Senior Club Football Championship:
Winner (1): 2001
Runner up: 2006, 2008
Ulster Senior Club Football League:
Winner (1): 2008
Derry Senior Football Championship:
Winner (4): 2001, 2002, 2006, 2008
Runner up: 1999, 2000, 2003
Derry Senior Football League:
Winner (4?/5?/6?): 1996?, 1997?, 2005, 2006, 2007, 2008
Numerous underage competitions

Province
Railway Cup:
Winner (at least 1):' 200x

Individual
Ballinderry Senior football captain: 2007

Note: The above lists may be incomplete. Please add any other honours you know of.

References

External links
Player profiles on Official Derry GAA website
Ballinderry Shamrocks GAC

1980 births
Living people
Ballinderry Gaelic footballers
Derry inter-county Gaelic footballers